The 2020–21 season was the 77th season in the existence of FC Nantes and the club's 17th consecutive season in the top flight of French football. In addition to the domestic league, Nantes participated in this season's edition of the Coupe de France. The season covered the period from 1 July 2020 to 30 June 2021.

Players

First-team squad

Players out on loan

Transfers

In

Out

Pre-season and friendlies

Competitions

Overview

Ligue 1

League table

Results summary

Results by round

Matches
The league fixtures were announced on 9 July 2020.

Relegation play-offs

Coupe de France

Statistics

Goalscorers

References

External links

FC Nantes seasons
FC Nantes